Mandarin Duck Blades, also known as Blade-Dance of the Two Lovers, is a wuxia novella by Jin Yong (Louis Cha). It was first serialised in 1961 in the Hong Kong newspaper Ming Pao.

Plot 
The story is set in China during the Qing dynasty. A pair of precious blades known as the Mandarin Duck Blades are being transported to the Forbidden City by a security company commissioned by provincial officials. The blades are highly coveted by many martial artists in the jianghu (martial artists' community) because they are rumoured to hold a secret to invincibility. The officials have also detained the security company chief's family members under the pretext of protecting them while actually holding them hostage to ensure that he does not keep the blades for himself.

In the midst of various attempts by different parties to intercept the convoy and seize the blades, eventually, through serendipity, the weapons end up in the hands of two couples: Yuan Guannan and Xiao Zhonghui, and Lin Yulong and Ren Feiyan. They are defeated by Zhuo Tianxiong, a highly skilled imperial guard who disguises himself as a blind man and hides in the convoy to protect the blades. The couples are forced to seek refuge in a dilapidated temple while attempting to evade pursuit by Zhuo and his men. Out of desperation, Lin Yulong and Ren Feiyan teach the younger couple, Yuan Guannan and Xiao Zhonghui, a saber movement known as the Couple's Sabers. The saber movement covers the two partners' weaknesses while increasing their combat prowess, making them virtually invincible. Yuan and Xiao defeat Zhuo with this new technique.

Later, Yuan Guannan visits Xiao Zhonghui's manor during her father's 50th birthday party and receives a warm welcome. He meets Xiao Zhonghui's father, Xiao Banhe, and his wives, Madam Yang and Madam Yuan. During the party, Zhuo Tianxiong and his men show up to seize the blades. At the same time, a group of soldiers show up to arrest Xiao Banhe, who is revealed to be one of the government's most wanted renegades.

While fighting their way out, the young couple's combat prowess is seriously compromised when they are unnerved upon realising that Yuan Guannan is Madam Yuan's long-lost son, making him Xiao Zhonghui's half-brother. The group takes refuge in a nearby cave, where Xiao Banhe tells his story.

Xiao Banhe reveals his true identity as a former rebel who had infiltrated the palace by disguising himself as a eunuch. In the palace prison, he had encountered Yuan and Yang, two other rebels who had been captured and imprisoned along with their families. After Yuan and Yang were executed, Xiao Banhe had broken into the prison and saved their widows and children. Yuan's son (Yuan Guannan) was separated from the group while they were escaping. Xiao Banhe took care of the two widows and pretended to be their husband all this while. He also raised Yang's daughter (Xiao Zhonghui) as his own child. Upon the revelation of the truth, it means that Yuan Guannan and Xiao Zhonghui are not related by blood, hence they can continue their romance.

Zhuo Tianxiong is coincidentally captured by the "Four Heroes of Taiyue" – four lucky and not-so-highly skilled comical martial artists – and the soldiers retreat. Xiao Banhe reveals the blades' secret: an inscription which says "the merciful are invincible".

Characters 

 Yuan Guannan
 Xiao Zhonghui
 Lin Yulong
 Ren Feiyan
 Xiao Banhe
 Zhuo Tianxiong
 Zhou Weixin
 "Four Heroes of Taiyue":
 Xiaoyaozi
 Chang Changfeng
 Hua Jianying
 Gai Yiming

Adaptations 
In 1961 Hong Kong's Emei Film Company produced a two-part Cantonese film based on the story. The film was directed by Lee Fa and starred Lam Fung and Chow Chung as Xiao Zhonghui and Yuan Guannan respectively.

In 1982, Hong Kong's Shaw Brothers film company produced the film with the title Lovers' Blades. It was directed by Lu Jungu, written by Ni Wei, and starred Hui Yinghong as Xiao Zhonghui, Meng Yuanwen as Yuan Guannan, Yuan De as Lin Yulong, Wen Xue-er as Ren Feiyan, and Wang Longwei as Zhuo Tianxiong.

References 

1961 novels
Novels by Jin Yong
Novels first published in serial form
Works originally published in Ming Pao
Novels set in the Qing dynasty